Oisín Kelly (born 1997) is an Irish hurler who plays as a left corner-forward for the Offaly senior team.

Born in Belmont, County Offaly, Kelly first played competitive hurling during his schooling at Banagher College. He arrived on the inter-county scene at the age of sixteen when he first linked up with the Offaly minor team before later joining the under-21 side. Kelly made his senior debut during the 2016 championship.

At club level Kelly plays hurling with Belmont GAA and football with Ferbane GAA.

References

1997 births
Living people
Ferbane Gaelic footballers
Belmont hurlers
Offaly inter-county hurlers